Agrilodia is a genus of beetles in the family Buprestidae, containing the following species:

 Agrilodia hirundo (Chevrolat, 1838)
 Agrilodia iris (Gory, 1841)
 Agrilodia leopardina Obenberger, 1943
 Agrilodia oporina Obenberger, 1924
 Agrilodia paraguayensis Obenberger, 1923

References

Buprestidae genera